The 1st Yerevan Golden Apricot International Film Festival was a film festival held in Yerevan, Armenia from June 30 to July 4, 2004. The festival attracted attention from all over the world while including 148 films representing over 70 filmmakers from 20 countries. Grand Prizes of the first Golden Apricot festival went to Atom Egoyan (Feature Film Competition), Stephane Elmadjian (Short Film and Experimental) and Armen Khachatryan (Documentary).

About the Golden Apricot Yerevan International Film Festival 
The Golden Apricot Yerevan International Film Festival (GAIFF) is an annual film festival held in Yerevan, Armenia. The festival was founded in 2004 with the co-operation of the “Golden Apricot” Fund for Cinema Development, the Armenian Association of Film Critics and Cinema Journalists. The GAIFF is continually supported by the Ministry of Foreign Affairs of the RA, the Ministry of Culture of the RA and the Benevolent Fund for Cultural Development.The objectives of the festival are "to present new works by the film directors and producers in Armenia and foreign cinematographers of Armenian descent and to promote creativity and originality in the area of cinema and video art".

Awards GAIFF 2004

See also 
 Golden Apricot Yerevan International Film Festival
 Atom Egoyan 
 Cinema of Armenia
 2004 in film

References

Yerevan International Film Festival
21st century in Yerevan
2004 in Armenia
2004 film festivals
2004 festivals in Asia
2004 festivals in Europe